The David Grisman Quintet is the eponymous debut album by the David Grisman Quintet, recorded in 1976 and released in 1977.

Cover
The instruments pictured on the cover are David's 1927 Gibson F-5 Mandolin, Darol's 1856 Guisepe Marconcine "Ferrara" Violin, Tony's 1935 Martin D-28 Guitar, Todd's 1924 Loar Gibson F-5 Mandolin, on loan, and Bill's 1875 Czech Flatback Bass.

Track listing 
All songs by David Grisman unless otherwise noted.
 "E.M.D." – 2:37
 "Swing 51" (Tony Rice) – 4:25
 "Opus 57" – 2:56
 "Blue Midnite" – 3:40
 "Pneumonia" – 4:31
 "Fish Scale" (Artie Traum) – 7:30
 "Richochet" (Grisman, Richard Somers) – 2:05
 "Dawg's Rag" – 9:04
added on CD
 "Minor Swing" (Stephane Grappelli, Django Reinhardt) – 2:59
 "16-16" - 5:35

Personnel

David Grisman – mandolin, vocals
Tony Rice – guitar, vocals
Darol Anger – fiddle, mandolin, violectra, vocals
Bill Amatneek – bass
Todd Phillips – mandolin
Production notes:
David Grisman – producer
Bill Wolf – engineer
Bob Shumaker – mixing
Ted Sharpe – design
Robert Schleifer - photography

References

1977 albums
David Grisman albums
Tony Rice albums